The Rudăria-Bănia mine is a large open pit mine in the south-western Romania in Caraș-Severin County. Rudăria-Bănia represents one of the largest iron ore reserves in Romania having estimated reserves of 70 million tonnes of ore grading 45% iron metal and 20% manganese metal. The mine has the capability to produce around 500,000 tonnes of iron ore/year.

References 

Iron mines in Romania
Manganese mines in Romania
Buildings and structures in Caraș-Severin County